This is a list of German painters.

A 
 
 Hans von Aachen (1552–1615)
 Aatifi (born 1965)
 Karl Abt (1899–1985)
 Tomma Abts (born 1967)
 Andreas Achenbach (1815–1910)
 Oswald Achenbach (1827–1905)
 Herbert Achternbusch (1938–2022)
 Franz Ackermann (born 1963)
 Johann Adam Ackermann (1780–1853)
 Max Ackermann (1887–1975)
 Otto Ackermann (1872–1953)
 Albrecht Adam (1786–1862)
 Benno Adam (1812–1892)
 Emil Adam (1843–1924)
 Eugen Adam (1817–1880)
 Franz Adam (1815–1886)
 Heinrich Adam (1787–1862)
 Luitpold Adam (1888–1950)
 Jankel Adler (1895–1949)
 Salomon Adler (1630–1709)
 Christoph Ludwig Agricola (1667–1719)
 Karl Agricola (1779–1852)
 August Ahlborn (1796–1857)
 Erwin Aichele (1887–1974)
 Wolfram Aichele (1924–2016)
 Max Ainmiller (1807–1870)
 Josef Albers (1888–1976)
 Heinrich Jacob Aldenrath (1775–1844)
 William Alexander (1915–1997)
 Christian Wilhelm Allers (1857–1915)
 Jakob Alt (1789–1872)
 Theodor Alt (1846–1937)
 Albrecht Altdorfer (c 1480–1538)
 Kai Althoff (born 1966)
 Karl Altmann (1802–1861)
 Hans am Ende (1864–1918)
 Christoph Amberger (1505–1562)
 Heinrich Amersdorffer (1905–1986)
 Tobias Andreae (1823–1873)
 Peter Angermann (born 1945)
 Hermann Anschütz (1802–1880)
 Horst Antes (born 1936)
 Karl von Appen (1900–1981)
 Joseph Ignaz Appiani (1706–1785) 
 Clara Arnheim (1865–1942)
 Johann Samuel Arnhold (1766–1828)
 Ferdinand von Arnim (1814–1866)
 Heinrich Gotthold Arnold (1785–1854)
 Ulrike Arnold (born 1950)
 Carl Arp (1867–1913)
 Hans Arp (1886–1966)
 Otto Arpke (1886–1943)
 Isidor Ascheim (1891–1968)
 Hans Aschenborn (1888–1931)
 Fritz Ascher (1893–1970)
 Louis Asher (1804–1878)
 Frank Auerbach (born 1931)

B 

 Johannes Theodor Baargeld (1892–1927)
 Johanna Juliana Friederike Bacciarelli (1733–1809 or later)
 Elvira Bach (born 1951)
 Johann Sebastian Bach (1748–1778)
 Karl Daniel Friedrich Bach (1756–1829)
 Carola Baer-von Mathes (1857–1940) 
 Emanuel Bachrach-Barée (1863–1943)
 Johann Daniel Bager (1734–1815)
 Johann Karl Bähr (1801–1869)
 Theodor Baierl (1881–1932)
 Hans Baldung (c. 1484–1545)
 Jan Balet (1913–2009)
 Karl Ballenberger (1801–1860)
 Hans Baluschek (1870–1935)
 Fritz Bamberger (1814–1873)
 Ernst von Bandel (1800–1876)
 Caroline Bardua (1781–1864)
 Eduard Bargheer (1901–1979)
 Hans von Bartels (1856–1913)
 Emil Bartoschek (1899–1969)
 Georg Baselitz (born 1938)
 Emil Bauch (1823–c. 1874)
 Jeanna Bauck (1840–1926)
 Michael Bauer (born 1973)
 Rudolf Bauer (1889–1953)
 Gustav Bauernfeind (1848–1904)
 Paul Baum (1859–1932)
 Willi Baumeister (1889–1955)
 Karin Baumeister-Rehm (born 1971)
 Tilo Baumgartel (born 1972)
 Armin Baumgarten (born 1967)
 Bodo Baumgarten (born 1940)
 Johann Wilhelm Baur (1607–1640)
 August von Bayer (1803–1875)
 Thommie Bayer (born 1953)
 Alf Bayrle (1900–1982)
 Fritz Beblo (1872–1947)
 August Becker (1821–1887)
 Ferdinand Becker (1846–1877)
 Hermann Heinrich Becker (1817–1885)
 Jakob Becker (1810–1872)
 Ludwig Hugo Becker (1834–1868)
 Philipp Jakob Becker (1763–1829)
 Max Beckmann (1884–1950)
 Karl Becker (1820–1900)
 Benedikt Beckenkamp (1747–1828)
 René Beeh (1886−1922)
 Josef Konstantin Beer (1862–1933)
 Adalbert Begas (1836–1888)
 Carl Joseph Begas (1794–1854)
 Luise Begas-Parmentier (1843–1920)
 Oskar Begas (1828–1883)
 Akbar Behkalam (born 1944)
 Franz Joachim Beich (1666–1748)
 Johannes Beilharz (born 1956)
 Gisela Beker (born 1932)
 Hans Bellmer (1920–1975)
 Eduard Bendemann (1811–1889)
 Amalie Bensinger (1809–1889)
 William Berczy (1744–1813)
 Charlotte Berend-Corinth (1880–1967)
 Josefa Berens-Totenohl (1891–1969)
 Rudolf Bergander (1909–1970)
 Claus Bergen (1885–1964)
 Georg Bergmann (1821–1870)
 Johann Martin Bernatz (1802–1878)
 Meister Bertram (c. 1345–c. 1415)
 Johann Wilhelm Beyer (1725–1796)
 Robert Beyschlag (1838-1903)
 Hanna Bieber-Böhm (1851–1910)
 Adolf Bierbrauer (1915–2012)
 Karl Eduard Biermann (1803–1892)
 Peter Binoit (c. 1590–1632)
 Norbert Bisky (born 1970)
 Carl Blechen (1798–1840)
 Georg Bleibtreu (1828–1892)
 Fritz Bleyl (1880–1966)
 Anna Katharina Block (1642–1719)
 Benjamin von Block (1631–1690)
 Josef Block (1863–1943)
 Hugo von Blomberg (1820–1871)
 Oscar Bluemner (1867–1938)
 Gregor von Bochmann (1850–1930)
 Arnold Bode (1900–1977)
 Leopold Bode (1831–1906)
 Gottlieb Bodmer (1804–1837)
 Arvid Boecker (born 1964)
 Pedro Boese (born 1972)
 Corbinian Böhm (born 1966)
 Hans Bohrdt (1857–1945)
 Christian Ludwig Bokelmann (1844–1894)
 Hanns Bolz (1885–1918)
 Friedrich von Bömches (1916–2010)
 Paula Bonte (1840–1902)
 Hinrik Bornemann (c. 1450–1499)
 Friedrich Boser (1811–1881)
 Harald Julius von Bosse (1812–1894)
 Otto Richard Bossert (1874–1919)
 Eberhard Bosslet (born 1953)
 Friedrich August Bouterwek (1806–1867)
 Anton Braith (1836–1905)
 August von Brandis (1859–1947)
 Martin Brandenburg (1870–1919)
 Heinrich Brandes (1803–1868)
 Marianne Brandt (1893–1983)
 Louis Braun (1836–1916)
 VG Braun-Dusemond (1919–1998)
 Rudolf Bredow (1909–1973)
 Ferdinand Max Bredt (1860–1921)
 K.P. Brehmer (1938–1997)
 Carl Breitbach (1833–1904)
 Heinrich Breling (1849–1914)
 Albert Heinrich Brendel (1827–1895)
 Louise Catherine Breslau (1856–1927)
 Johann Michael Bretschneider (1680–1729)
 Philipp Hieronymus Brinckmann (1709–1760)
 Gottfried Brockmann (1903–1983)
 Heinrich Brocksieper (1898–1968)
 Christian Brod (1917–2012)
 August Bromeis (1813–1881)
 Franz Bronstert (1895–1967)
 Wilhelm Brücke (1800–1874)
 Alexander Bruckmann (1806–1852)
 Ferdinand Brütt (1849–1936)
 Christoph Brüx (born 1965)
 Lothar-Günther Buchheim (1918–2007)
 Carl Buchheister (1890–1964)
 Erich Buchholz (1891–1972)
 Ludwig Buchhorn (1770–1856)
 Elisabeth Büchsel (1867–1957) 
 Heinz Budweg (born 1940)
 Karl Albert Buehr (1866–1952)
 Franz Bunke (1857–1939)
 Anton Burger (1824–1905)
 Ludwig Burger (1825–1884)
 Jonas Burgert (born 1969)
 Heinrich Bürkel (1802–1869)
 Peter Burnitz (1824–1886)
 Friedrich Bury (1763–1823)
 Wilhelm Busch (1832–1908)
 Georg Heinrich Busse (1810–1868)
 Michael Buthe (1944–1994)
 Bernhard Buttersack (1858–1925)
 Erich Büttner (1889–1936)
 André Butzer (born 1973)

C 

 Daniel Caffé (1750–1815)
 Heinrich Campendonk (1889–1957)
 Wilhelm Camphausen (1818–1885)
 Peter Candid (c. 1548–1628)
 Johann Hermann Carmiencke (1810–1867)
 Carl Gustav Carus (1789–1869)
 Peter Caulitz (c.1650–1719)
 Ludwig Choris (1795–1828)
 Philipp Christfeld (1796/97–1874)
 Kiddy Citny (born 1957)
 Lorenz Clasen (1812–1899)
 Gustav Adolf Closs (1864–1938)
 Ferdinand Collmann (1762–1837)
 Edward Harrison Compton (1881–1960)
 Edward Theodore Compton (1849–1921)
 Carl Conjola (1773–1831)
 Carl Emanuel Conrad (1810–1873)
 Johann Wilhelm Cordes (1824–1869)
 Lovis Corinth (1858–1925)
 Peter von Cornelius (1784–1867)
 Erich Correns (1821–1877)
 Helene Cramer (1844–1916)
 Molly Cramer (1852–1936)
 Augustin Cranach (1554–1595)
 Lucas Cranach the Elder (c. 1472–1553)
 Lucas Cranach the Younger (1515–1586)
 Georg Heinrich Crola (1804–1879)

D 

 Eduard Daege (1805–1883)
 Heinrich Anton Dähling (1773–1850)
 Maximilian Dasio (1865–1954)
 Gabriela Dauerer (born 1958)
 Heinrich Maria Davringhausen (1894–1970)
 John Decker (1895–1947)
 Wilm Dedeke (c. 1460–c. 1528)
 Ernst Deger (1809–1885)
 Balthasar Denner (1685–1749)
 Adolf Des Coudres (1862–1924)
 Ludwig Des Coudres (1820–1878)
 Ludwig Dettmann (1865–1944)
 Christa Dichgans (1940–2018)
 Christophe Didillon (born 1971)
 Karl Diebitsch (1899–1985)
 Karl Wilhelm Diefenbach (1851–1913)
 Jakob Fürchtegott Dielmann (1809–1885)
 Albert Christoph Dies (1755–1822)
 Anton Dietrich (1833–1904)
 Christian Wilhelm Ernst Dietrich (1712–1774)
 Wendel Dietterlin (c. 1550–1599)
 Feodor Dietz (1813–1870)
 Wilhelm von Diez (1839–1907)
 Ludwig Dill (1848–1940)
 Johann Georg von Dillis (1759–1841)
 Georg Friedrich Dinglinger (1666–1720)
 Otto Dix (1891–1969)
 Carl Emil Doepler (1824–1905)
 Emil Doepler (1855–1922)
 Max Doerner (1870–1939)
 Franz Domscheit (1880–1965)
 Franz Burchard Dörbeck (1799–1835)
 Johann Jakob Dorner the Elder (1741–1813)
 Anton Josef Dräger (1794–1833)
 Heinrich Dreber (1822–1875)
 Johann Friedrich Dryander (1756–1812)
 Eugen Dücker (1756–1812)
 Balthasar Anton Dunker (1746–1807)
 Albrecht Dürer (1471–1528)
 Hermann Dyck (1812–1874)
 Udo Dziersk (born 1961)

E 

 Konrad Eberhard (1768–1859)
 Adam Eberle (1804–1832)
 Robert Eberle (1815–1862)
 Johann Christian Eberlein (1770–1815)
 John Giles Eccardt (1720–1799)
 Michael Echter (1812–1879)
 Friedrich Eckenfelder (1861–1938)
 Heinrich Ambros Eckert (1807–1840)
 Otto Eckmann (1865–1902)
 John Eckstein (1735–1817)
 Martin Eder (born 1968)
 Carl Eggers (1787–1863)
 Franz Xaver Eggert (1802–1876)
 Julie von Egloffstein (1792–1869)
 Julius von Ehren (1864–1944)
 Paul Ehrenberg (1876–1949)
 Friedrich Eibner (1826–1877)
 Franz Eichhorst (1885–1948)
 Elisabeth von Eicken (1862–1940)
 Andreas Eigner (1801–1870)
 Fritz Eisel (1929–2010)
 Marie Ellenrieder (1791–1863)
 Friedrich August Elsasser (1810–1845)
 Adam Elsheimer (1578–1610)
 Ludwig Elsholtz (1805–1850)
 Wilhelm Emelé (1830–1905)
 Edgar Ende (1901–1965)
 Sylvester Engbrox (born 1964)
 Johann Friedrich Engel (1844–1921)
 Carl Engel von der Rabenau (1817–1870)
 Horus Engels (1914–1991)
 Karl von Enhuber (1811–1867)
 Josef Otto Entres (1804–1870)
 Ulrich Erben (born 1940)
 Otto Erdmann (1834–1905)
 Fritz Erler (1868–1940)
 Johann Franz Ermels (1641–1693)
 Max Ernst (1891–1976)
 Hermann Eschke (1823–1900)
 Stefan Ettlinger (born 1958)
 Ernst Ewald (1836–1904)
 Julius Exter (1863–1939)
 Carl Gottfried Eybe (1813–1893)
 Adolf Eybel (1802–1882)

F 

 Christian Wilhelm von Faber du Faur (1780–1857)
 Johann Joachim Faber (1778–1846)
 Carl Ferdinand Fabritius (1637–1673)
 Wilhelm Facklam (1893–1972)
 Ludwig Fahrenkrog (1867–1952)
 Joachim Martin Falbe (1709–1782)
 Joseph Fassbender (1903–1974)
 Berthold Faust (born 1935)
 Joseph Fay (1813–1875)
 Christian Gottlob Fechhelm (1732–1816)
 Eduard Clemens Fechner (1799–1861)
 Hans Feibusch (1898–1998)
 Manfred Feiler (1925–2020)
 Paul Feiler (1918–2013)
 Max Feldbauer (1869–1948)
 Conrad Felixmüller (1897–1977)
 Ferdinand Fellner (1799–1859)
 Melchior Feselen (c. 1495–1538)
 Rainer Fetting (born 1949)
 Johann Michael Feuchtmayer (1709–1772)
 Anselm Feuerbach (1829–1880)
 Martin von Feuerstein (1856–1941)
 Willy Fick (1893–1967)
 Friedrich Kurt Fiedler (1894–1950)
 Johann Dominicus Fiorillo (1748–1821)
 Klaus Fisch (1893–1975)
 John Fischer (1786–1875)
 Joseph Anton Fischer (1814–1859)
 Oskar Fischinger (1900–1967)
 Arthur Fitger (1840–1909)
 Ferdinand Wolfgang Flachenecker (1792–1847)
 Albert Flamm (1823–1906)
 Georg Flegel (1566–1638)
 François Fleischbein (1804–1868)
 Lutz Fleischer (1956–2019)
 Max Fleischer (1861–1930)
 Adolf Fleischmann (1892–1968)
 Gerlach Flicke (fl. 1545–1558)
 Fedor Flinzer (1832–1911)
 Gisbert Flüggen (1811–1859)
 Josef Flüggen (1842–1906)
 Daniel Fohr (1801–1862)
 Karl Philipp Fohr (1795–1818)
 Philipp von Foltz (1805–1877)
 Günther Förg (1952–2013)
 Ernst Joachim Förster (1800–1885)
 Arnold Forstmann (1842–c. 1914)
 Hans Ulrich Franck (1603–1675)
 Philipp Franck (1860–1944)
 Meister Francke (c. 1380–c. 1440)
 Michael Sigismund Frank (1770–1847)
 Eduard Frederich (1813–1864)
 Hermann Freese (1813–1871)
 Otto Freundlich (1878–1943)
 Max Frey (1874–1944)
 Maria Elektrine von Freyberg (1797–1847)
 Heinrich Jakob Fried (1802–1870)
 Caroline Friederike Friedrich (1749–1815)
 Caspar David Friedrich (1774–1840)
 Fred Friedrich (born 1943)
 Woldemar Friedrich (1846–1910)
 Fritz Friedrichs (1882–1928)
 Bernhard Fries (1820–1879)
 Ernst Fries (1801–1833)
 Karl Friedrich Fries (1831–1871)
 Richard Friese (1854–1918)
 Johann Christoph Frisch (1737–1815)
 Karl Ludwig Frommel (1789–1863)
 Günter Fruhtrunk (1923–1982)
 Ulrich Füetrer (c. 1450–1496/1500)
 Heinrich Füger (1751–1818)
 Hinrik Funhof (?–1485)
 Edmund Fürst (1874–1955)
 Klaus Fußmann (born 1938)
 Conrad Fyoll (fl. 1464–1476)

G 

 Eduard Gaertner (1801–1877)
 Bernd Erich Gall (born 1956)
 Franz Gareis (1775–1803)
 Friedrich Gärtner (1824–1905)
 Heinrich Gärtner (1828–1909)
 Anna Rosina de Gasc (1713–1783)
 Karl Gatermann the Elder (1883–1959)
 Karl Gatermann the Younger (1909–1992)
 Jakob Gauermann (1773–1843)
 Ernst Gebauer (1782–1865)
 Eduard von Gebhardt (1838–1925)
 Josef Anton Gegenbauer (1800–1876)
 Otto Geigenberger (1881–1946)
 Rupprecht Geiger (1908–2009)
 Willi Geiger (1878–1971)
 Carl Geist (1870–1931)
 Bonaventura Genelli (1798–1868)
 Hanns Georgi (1901–1989)
 Ludger Gerdes (1954–2008)
 Till Gerhard (born 1971)
 Ida Gerhardi (1862–1927)
 Eduard Gerhardt (1813–1888)
 Anna Gerresheim (1852–1921)
 Ludwig Geyer (1779–1821)
 Hans Freiherr von Geyer zu Lauf (1895–1959)
 Torben Giehler (born 1973)
 Werner Gilles (1894–1961)
 Julius E.F. Gipkens (1883–1968)
 Joseph Anton Glantschnigg (1695–1750)
 Erich Glas (1897–1973)
 Horst Gläsker (born 1949)
 Ludwig von Gleichen-Rußwurm (1836–1901)
 Otto Gleichmann (1887–1963)
 Hermann Glöckner (1889–1987)
 Paul Salvator Goldengreen (born 1960)
 Hilde Goldschmidt (1897–1980)
 Dieter Goltzsche (born 1934)
 Paul Gösch (1885–1940)
 Karl Otto Götz (1914–2017)
 Leo Götz (1883–1962)
 Jakob Götzenberger (1802–1866)
 Carl Götzloff (1799–1866)
 Henry Gowa (1902–1990)
 Gustav Graef (1821–1895)
 Peter Graf (born 1937)
 Albert Gräfle (1809–1889)
 August Grahl (1791–1868)
 Walter Gramatté (1897–1929)
 Fritz Grasshoff (1913–1997)
 Gotthard Graubner (1930–2013)
 Otto Greiner (1869–1916)
 Fritz Greve (1863–1931)
 Otto Griebel (1895–1972)
 Christian Griepenkerl (1839–1912)
 HAP Grieshaber (1909–1981)
 Ludwig Emil Grimm (1790–1863)
 Friedrich Carl Gröger (1766–1838)
 Carl Grossberg (1894–1940)
 Theodor Grosse (1829–1891)
 George Grosz (1893–1959)
 Michael Gruber (born 1965)
 Hans Grundig (1901–1958)
 Emil Otto Grundmann (1844–1890)
 Matthias Grünewald (c. 1470–1528)
 Jakob Grünenwald(1821–1896)
 Eduard von Grützner (1846–1925)
 Richard Guhr (1873–1956)
 Louis Gurlitt (1812–1897)
 Karl Gussow (1843–1907)

H 

 Carl Haag (1820–1915)
 August Haake (1889–1915)
 Hugo von Habermann (1849–1929)
 Wenzel Hablik (1881–1934)
 Jakob Philipp Hackert (1737–1807)
 Gabriel von Hackl (1843–1926)
 Karl Hagedorn (1922–2005)
 Karl Hagemeister (1848–1933)
 Theodor Hagen (1842–1919)
 Ludwig von Hagn (1820–1898)
 Magda Hagstotz (1914–2001)
 Hubert Haider (1879–1971) 
 Karl Michael Haider (1846–1912)
 Jost Haller (fl. 1440−1470)
 Christian Gottlob Hammer (1779–1864)
 Alois Hanslian (born 1943)
 Johann Gottlieb Hantzsch (1794–1848)
 Heinrich Harder (1858–1935)
 Fritz Harnest (1905–1999)
 Hans Hartung (1904–1989)
 Petre Hârtopeanu (1913–2001)
 Wilhelm Hasemann (1850–1913)
 Carl Hasenpflug (1802–1858)
 Max Haushofer (1811–1866)
 Eberhard Havekost (1967–2019)
 John Heartfield (1891–1968)
 Erich Heckel (1883–1970)
 Jakob Hecker (1897–1969)
 Michael Heckert (born 1950)
 Elise Neumann Hedinger (1854–1923)
 Carl Wilhelm von Heideck (1788–1861)
 Wilhelm Heine (1827–1885)
 Bettina Heinen-Ayech (1937–2020)
 Thilo Heinzmann (born 1969)
 Johannes Heisig (born 1953)
 Werner Heldt (1904–1954)
 Wilhelm Hempfing (1886–1948)
 Hermann Hendrich (1854–1931)
 Wilhelm Hensel (1794–1861)
 Thomas Herbst (1848–1915)
 Friedrich Herlin (c. 1425/30–1500)
 Franz Georg Hermann (1692–1768)
 Curt Herrmann (1854–1929)
 Ludwig von Herterich (1856–1932)
 Hermann Ottomar Herzog (1832–1932)
 Heinrich Maria von Hess (1798–1863)
 Karl Hess (1801–1874)
 Peter von Hess (1792–1871)
 Carle Hessay (1911–1978)
 Philipp Friedrich von Hetsch (1758–1839)
 Werner Heuser (1880–1964)
 Adolf von Heydeck (1787–1856)
 Ernst Hildebrand (1833–1924)
 Eduard Hildebrandt (1818–1868)
 Theodor Hildebrandt (1804–1874)
 Ludwig Hirschfeld Mack (1893–1965)
 Rudolf Hirth du Frênes (1846–1916)
 Dora Hitz (1856–1924)
 Hannah Höch (1889–1978)
 Paul Hoecker (1854–1910)
 Angelika Hoerle (1899–1923)
 Bernhard Hoetger (1874–1949)
 Heinrich Hofmann (1824–1911)
 Ludwig von Hofmann (1861–1945)
 Margret Hofheinz-Döring (1910–1994)
 Hans Hofmann (1880–1966)
 Otto Hofmann (1907–1996)
 Hans Holbein the Elder (c. 1460–1524) 
 Hans Holbein the Younger (c. 1497–1543)
 Hans-Jörg Holubitschka (1960–2016)
 Johann Evangelist Holzer (1709–1740)
 Helene Holzman (1891–1968)
 Barbara Honigmann (born 1949)
 Theodor Horschelt (1829–1871)
 Margarethe Hormuth-Kallmorgen (1857–1934)
 Theodor Hosemann (1807–1875)
 Woldemar Hottenroth (1802–1894)
 Karl Hubbuch (1891–1979)
 Julius Hübner (1806–1882)
 Ulrich Hübner (1872–1932)
 Juergen von Huendeberg (1922–1996)
 Carl Hummel (1821–1907)
 Maria Innocentia Hummel (1909–1946)
 Otto Hupp (1859–1949)
 Karl Hurm (1930–2019)
 Auguste Hüssener (1789–1877)

I 

 Berthold Imhoff (1868–1939)
 Jörg Immendorff (1945–2007)
 Caspar Isenmann (1410–1484) (hypothetical)
 Carl G. von Iwonski (1830–1912)

J 

 Otto Reinhold Jacobi (1812–1901)
 Paul Emil Jacobs (1802–1866)
 Willy Jaeckel (1888–1944)
 Ferdinand Jagemann (1780–1820)
 Gustav Jäger (1808–1871)
 Karl Jäger (1888–1959)
 Michael Jäger (born 1956)
 Angelo Jank (1868–1940)
 Christian Jank (1833–1888)
 Peter Janssen (1844–1908)
 Georg Jauss (1867–1922)
 Carl Ludwig Jessen (1833–1917)
 Ernst Jordan (1883–1948)
 Rudolf Jordan (1810–1887)
 Tina Juretzek (born 1952)
 Manfred W. Jürgens (born 1956)
 Paul Juvenel the Elder (1579–1643)

K 

 Johann Matthias Kager (1566–1634)
 Leo Kahn (1894–1983)
 Johannes Kahrs (born 1965)
 Aris Kalaizis (born 1966)
 Leopold Graf von Kalckreuth (1855–1928)
 Maria Countess von Kalckreuth (1857–1897)
 Patrick von Kalckreuth (1892–1970)
 Friedrich Kallmorgen (1856–1924)
 Arthur Kampf (1864–1950)
 Albert Kappis (1836–1914)
 Suzan Emine Kaube (born 1942)
 Arthur Kaufmann (1888–1971)
 Hugo Kauffmann (1844–1915)
 Friedrich Kaulbach (1822–1903)
 Friedrich August von Kaulbach (1850–1920)
 Hermann von Kaulbach (1846–1909)
 Wilhelm von Kaulbach (1805–1874)
 Ferdinand Keller (1842–1922)
 Moritz Kellerhoven (1758–1830)
 George Kenner (1888–1971)
 Wolfgang Kermer (born 1935)
 Marie von Keudell (1838–1918)
 Chaim Kiewe (1912–1983)
 Wilhelm Kimmich (1897–1986)
 Martin Kippenberger (1953–1997)
 Frank Kirchbach (1859–1912)
 Günther C. Kirchberger (1928–2010)
 Alexander Kircher (1867–1939)
 Otto Kirchner (1887–1960)
 Ernst Ludwig Kirchner (1880–1938)
 Johanna Kirsch (1856–1907)
 Konrad Klapheck (born 1935)
 Mati Klarwein (1932–2002)
 Anna Klein (1883–1941) 
 Johann Adam Klein (1792–1875)
 Richard Klein (1890–1967)
 Paul Kleinschmidt (1883–1949)
 Leo von Klenze (1784–1864)
 Heinrich Kley (1863–1945)
 Max Klinger (1857–1920)
 Friedrich August von Klinkowström (1778–1835)
 Hans Kloss (1938–2018)
 Robert Klümpen (born 1973)
 Georg Klusemann (1942–1981)
 Karl Knabl (1850–1904)
 Hermann Knackfuß (1848–1915)
 Johann Zacharias Kneller (1642–1702)
 Heinrich Knirr (1862–1944)
 Imi Knoebel (born 1940)
 Hugo Knorr (1834–1904)
 Wilhelm von Kobell (1766–1853)
 Martin Kober (~1550–~1598)
 Dora Koch-Stetter (1881–1968) (aka Dora Stetter)
 Robert Koehler (1850–1917)
 Matthias Koeppel (born 1937)
 Wilhelm von Köln (1370s?)
 Alois Kolb (1875–1942)
 Heinrich Christoph Kolbe (1771–1836)
 Helmut Kolle (1899–1931)
 Kätte Kollwitz (1867-1945)
 Max Koner (1854–1900)
 Leo von König (1871–1944)
 Emma Körner (1788–1815)
 Rudolf Kortokraks (1928–2014)
 Theodor Kotsch (1818–1884)
 Johann Peter Krafft (1780–1856)
 Lambert Krahe (1712–1790)
 August von Kreling (1819–1876)
 Robert Kretschmer (1812–1872)
 Conrad Faber von Kreuznach (c. 1500–1552/3)
 Louis Krevel (1801–1876)
 Karl Kröner (1887–1972)
 Franz Krüger (1797–1857)
 Sebastian Krüger (born 1963)
 Christiane Kubrick (born 1932)
 Gerhard von Kügelgen (1772–1820)
 Karl von Kügelgen (1772–1832)
 Wilhelm von Kügelgen (1802–1867)
 Gotthardt Kuehl (1850–1915)
 Ingo Kühl (born 1953)
 Friedrich Wilhelm Kuhnert (1865–1926)
 Konrad Kujau (1938–2000)
 Friedrich Kunath (born 1974)

L 

 Curt Lahs (1893–1958)
 Mark Lammert (born 1960)
 Christian Landenberger (1862–1927)
 Friedrich Lange (1834–1875)
 Joseph Lange (1751–1831)
 Julius Lange (1817–1878)
 Arthur Langhammer (1854–1901)
 Rainer Maria Latzke (born 1950)
 Richard Lauchert (1823–1868)
 Paul Lautensack (1478–1558)
 Rudolf Lehmann (1819–1905)
 Hildegard Lehnert (1857–1943)
 Fridolin Leiber (1853–1912)
 Ulrich Leman (1885–1988)
 August Lemmer (1862–?)
 Franz von Lenbach (1836–1904)
 Reinhold Lepsius (1857–1922)
 Sabine Lepsius (1864–1942)
 Karl Friedrich Lessing (1808–1880)
 Wolfgang Lettl (1919–2008)
 August Leu (1818–1897)
 Emanuel Leutze (1816–1868)
 Sophie Ley (1849–1918)
 Wilhelm Lichtenheld (1817–1891)
 Max Liebermann (1847–1935)
 Adolf Heinrich Lier (1826–1882)
 Hermann Linde (1863–1923)
 Heinrich Eduard Linde-Walther (1868–1939)
 Richard Lindner (1901–1978)
 Karl Friedrich Lippmann (1883–1957)
 Emmy Lischke (1860–1919)
 Clara Lobedan (1840–1918)
 Stefan Lochner (c. 1410–1451)
 Käthe Loewenthal (1878–1942)
 August Löffler (1822–1866)
 Ludwig von Löfftz (1845–1910)
 Max Lohde (1845–1868)
 Otto Lohmüller (born 1943)
 Elfriede Lohse-Wächtler (1899–1940)
 Bernard Lokai (born 1960)
 David Lorenz (1856–1907)
 Heinrich Lossow (1843–1897)
 Károly Lotz (1833–1904)
 Margarethe Loewe-Bethe (1859–1932)
 Auguste Ludwig (1834–1901) 
 Friedrich Ludwig (1895–1970) 
 Jules Lunteschütz (1822–1893)
 Markus Lüpertz (born 1941)
 Vilma Lwoff-Parlaghy (1863–1923)
 Arnold Lyongrün (1871–1935)

M 

 Thilo Maatsch (1900–1983)
 Heinz Mack (born 1931)
 August Macke (1887–1914)
 Fritz Mackensen (1866–1953)
 Josef Madlener (1881–1967)
 Alfred Mahlau (1894–1967)
 Carl Malchin (1838–1923)
 Christian Mali (1832–1906)
 Lothar Malskat (1913–1988)
 Jeanne Mammen (1890–1976)
 Henriette Manigk (born 1968)
 Johann Christian von Mannlich (1741–1822)
 Jean Mannheim (1863–1945) German-born American 
 Ludwig Manzel (1858–1936)
 Franz Marc (1880–1916)
 Hans von Marées (1837–1887)
 Carl von Marr (1858–1936)
 Jacob Marrel (1613/4?–1681)
 Johannes Martini (1866–1935)
 Master of the Arboga altarpiece (fl. 1490–1525)
 Master of the Drapery Studies (Heinrich Lützelmann) (fl. 1470–1500)
 Master of the Karlsruhe Passion (Hans Hirtz?) (fl. 1421–1463)
 Master of the Saint Bartholomew Altarpiece (fl. 1475–1510)
 Fritz Maurischat (1893–1986)
 Louis Mayer (1791–1843)
 Jonathan Meese (born 1970)
 Lothar Meggendorfer (1847–1925)
 Ludwig Meidner (1884–1966)
 Else Meidner (1901–1987)
 Georg Meistermann (1911–1990)
 Hans Memling (c. 1430–1494)
 Peter Menne (born 1960)
 Carlo Mense (1886–1965)
 Adolph Menzel (1815–1905)
 Joseph Anton Merz (1681–1750)
 Pius Ferdinand Messerschmitt (1858–1915)
 Friedrich Eduard Meyerheim (1808–1879)
 Paul Friedrich Meyerheim (1842–1915)
 Abraham Mignon (1640–1679)
 Carl Julius Milde (1803–1875)
 Amud Uwe Millies (1932–2008)
 Paula Modersohn-Becker (1876–1907)
 Manfred Mohr (born 1938)
 Christian Ernst Bernhard Morgenstern (1805–1867)
 Wilhelm Morgner (1891–1917)
 Sabine Moritz (born 1969)
 Friedrich Mosbrugger (1804–1830)
 Adolf Mosengel (1837–1885)
 Georg Muche (1895–1987)
 Heinrich Mücke (1806–1891)
 Otto Mueller (1874–1930)
 Armin Mueller-Stahl (born 1930)
 Georg Mühlberg (1863–1925)
 Fritz Mühlenweg (1898–1961)
 Andreas Müller (1811–1890)
 Heiko Müller (born 1968)
 Maler Müller (1749–1825)
 Otto Müller (1898–1979)
 Victor Müller (1829–1871)
 Paul Müller-Kaempff (1861–1941)
 Gabriele Münter (1877–1962)
 Gustav Mützel (1839–1893)
 Johan van den Mynnesten (c. 1440–1504)

N 

 Charles Christian Nahl (1818–1878)
 Hugo Wilhelm Arthur Nahl (1833–1889)
 Thomas von Nathusius (1866–1904)
 August Natterer (1868–1933)
 Julius Naue (1835–1907)
 Ernst Wilhelm Nay (1902–1968)
 Carl Nebel (1805–1855)
 Otto Nebel (1892–1973)
 Bernhard von Neher (1806–1886)
 Rolf Nesch (1893–1975)
 Caspar Netscher (1639–1684)
 Gert Neuhaus (born 1939)
 Andrea Neumann (1969–2020)
 Eugen Napoleon Neureuther (1806–1882)
 Jo Niemeyer (born 1946)
 Wilhelm Theodor Nocken (1830–1905)
 Emil Nolde (1867–1956)
 Franz Nölken (1884–1918)
 Bernt Notke (1435–1508/09?)
 Felix Nussbaum (1904–1944)

O 

 Franz Ignaz Oefele (1721–1797)
 Ernst Erwin Oehme (1831–1907)
 Ernst Ferdinand Oehme (1797–1855)
 August Friedrich Oelenhainz (1745–1804)
 Theobald von Oer (1807–1885)
 Hans Olde (1855–1917)
 Friedrich von Olivier (1791–1859)
 Walter Ophey (1882–1930)
 Ernst Oppler (1867–1929)
 David Ostrowski (born 1981)
 Friedrich Overbeck (1789–1869)

P 

 Amalia Pachelbel (1688–1723)
 Blinky Palermo (1943–1977)
 Otto Pankok (1893–1966)
 Louise von Panhuys (1763–1844)
 Jürgen Partenheimer (born 1947)
 Eduard Pechuel-Loesche (1840–1913)
 Werner Peiner (1897–1984)
 A. R. Penck (1939–2017)
 Carl Gottlieb Peschel (1798–1879)
 Johann Anton de Peters (1725–1795)
 Heinrich Petersen-Angeln (1850–1906)
 Wolfgang Petrick (born 1939)
 Johann Baptist Pflug (1785–1866)
 Martin Erich Philipp (1887–1978)
 Otto Piene (1928–2014)
 Ludwig Pietsch (1824–1911)
 Bruno Piglhein (1848–1894)
 Carl Theodor von Piloty (1826–1886)
 Hartmut Piniek (born 1950)
 Theodor Pixis (1831–1907)
 Oscar Pletsch (1830–1888)
 Hermann Pleuer (1863–1911)
 Bernhard Plockhorst (1825–1907)
 Alois Plum (born 1935)
 Tobias Pock (1609–1683)
 Leon Pohle (1841–1908)
 Sigmar Polke (1941–2010)
 Heinrich Pommerencke (1821–1873)
 Eduard Wilhelm Pose (1812–1878)
 Michael Mathias Prechtl (1926–2003)
 Johann Daniel Preissler (1666–1737)
 Hermann Prell (1854–1922)
 Hermione von Preuschen (1854–1918)
 Heimrad Prem (1934–1978)
 Johann Georg Primavesi (1774–1855)
 Hans Purrmann (1880–1966)
 Doramaria Purschian (1890–1972)

Q 

 Franz Quaglio (1844–1920)
 Simon Quaglio (1795–1878)
 Silvia Quandt (born 1937)
 Fritz Quant (1888–1933)
 Otto Quante (1875–1947)
 Curt Querner (1904–1976)
 Tobias Querfurt (1660–1734)

R 

 Doris Raab (1851–1933)
 Johann Leonhard Raab (1825–1899)
 Johann Heinrich Ramberg (1763–1840)
 Johann Anton Ramboux (1790–1866)
 Lilo Ramdohr (1913–2013)
 Lilo Rasch-Naegele (1914–1978)
 Neo Rauch (born 1960)
 Robert Hermann Raudner (1854–1915)
 Karl Raupp (1837–1918)
 Christopher Rave (1881–1933)
 Hilla von Rebay (1890–1967)
 Anita Rée (1885–1933)
 Willy Reetz (1892–1963)
 Theodor Rehbenitz (1791–1861)
 Elke Rehder (born 1953)
 Carl Theodor Reiffenstein (1820–1893)
 Johann Friedrich Reiffenstein (1719–1793)
 Heinrich Reinhold (1788–1825)
 Robert Reinick (1805–1852)
 Carl Reinhardt (1818–1877)
 Karl Lorenz Rettich (1841–1904)
 Moritz Retzsch (1779–1857)
 Gerhardt Wilhelm von Reutern (1794–1865)
 Ottilie Reylaender (1882-1965)
 Gustav Richter (1823–1884)
 Hans Richter (1888–1976)
 Adrian Ludwig Richter (1803–1884)
 Gerhard Richter (born 1932)
 Johann Elias Ridinger (1698–1767)
 August Riedel (1799–1883)
 Franz Riepenhausen (1786–1831)
 Johannes Riepenhausen (1787–1860)
 Johann Christoph Rincklake (1764–1813)
 Joachim Ringelnatz (1883–1934)
 Wilhelm Ripe (1818–1885)
 Otto Ritschl (1860–1944)
 Paul Ritter (1829–1907)
 Günter Rittner (1927–2020)
 Lorenz Ritter (1832–1921)
 Theodor Rocholl (1854–1933)
 Carl Röchling (1855–1920)
 Bernhard Rode (1725–1797)
 Hermen Rode (c. 1468–c. 1504)
 Carl Rodeck (1841–1909)
 Ottilie Roederstein (1859–1937)
 Nicholas Roerich (1874–1947)
 Julius Roeting (1822–1896)
 Johann Martin von Rohden (1778–1868)
 Stefan Roloff (born 1953)
 Johann Heinrich Roos (1631–1685)
 Johann Melchior Roos (1663–1731)
 Philipp Peter Roos (1655–1706)
 Theodor Roos (1638–1698)
 Ludwig Rosenfelder (1813–1881)
 Walter Alfred Rosam (1883–1916)
 Mike Rose (1932–2006)
 Waldemar Rösler (1882–1916)
 Kurt Roth (1899–1975)
 Ferdinand Rothbart (1823–1899)
 Johannes Rottenhammer (1564–1625)
 Christian Ruben (1805–1875)
 Dieter Rübsaamen (born 1937)
 Georg Philipp Rugendas (1666–1742)
 Hans Hinrich Rundt (c. 1660–c. 1750)
 Philipp Otto Runge (1777–1810)
 Heinrich von Rustige (1810–1900)

S 

 Georg Saal (1817–1870)
 Rolf Sackenheim (1921–2006)
 Hubert Salentin (1822–1910)
 Charlotte Salomon (1917–1943)
 Joachim von Sandrart (1606–1688)
 Georg Sauter (1866–1937)
 Wilhelm Sauter (1896–1948)
 Käte Schaller-Härlin (1877–1973)
 Thomas Scheibitz (born 1968)
 Wolfram Adalbert Scheffler (born 1956)
 Auguste Schepp (1846–1905)
 Osmar Schindler (1867–1927)
 Adolf Schinnerer (1876–1949)
 Johann Wilhelm Schirmer (1807–1863)
 Wilhelm Schirmer (1802–1866)
 Eduard Schleich the Elder (1812–1874)
 Oskar Schlemmer (1888–1943)
 Thea Schleusner (1879–1964) 
 Hans-Jürgen Schlieker (1924–2004)
 Eberhard Schlotter (1921–2014)
 Torsten Schlüter (born 1959)
 Georg Friedrich Schmidt (1712–1775)
 Joost Schmidt (1893–1948)
 Julia Schmidt (born 1976)
 Jürgen Schmitt (born 1949)
 Max Schmidt (1818–1901)
 Gerda Schmidt-Panknin (1920–2021)
 Karl Schmidt-Rottluff (1884–1976)
 Ruth Schmidt Stockhausen (1922-2014)
 Marc Schmitz (born 1963)
 Bertha Schrader (1845–1920) 
 Leopold Schmutzler (1864–1940)
 Friedrich Schneider (1786–1853)
 Paul Schneider (1884–1969)
 Sascha Schneider (1870–1927)
 Joseph Anton Schneiderfranken (1876–1943)
 Julius Schnorr von Carolsfeld (1794–1872)
 Otto Scholderer (1834–1902)
 Georg Scholz (1890–1945)
 Karl Schorn (1803–1850)
 Ludwig Schongauer (c. 1440–1494)
 Johann Heinrich Schönfeld (1609–1684)
 Julius Schoppe (1795–1868)
 Georg Schrimpf (1889–1938)
 Adolf Schreyer (1828–1899)
 Lothar Schreyer (1886–1966)
 Hans Schröder (1931–2010)
 Werner Schramm (1898–1970)
 Liselotte Schramm-Heckmann (1904–1995)
 Daniel Schultz (1615–1683)
 Bernard Schultze (1915–2005)
 Fritz W. Schulz (1884–1962)
 Emil Schumacher (1912–1999)
 Wilhelm Schütze (1807–1878)
 Fritz Schwegler (1935–2014)
 Carlos Schwabe (1866–1926)
 Otto Schwerdgeburth (1835–1866)
 Martel Schwichtenberg  (1896–1945)
 Kurt Schwitters (1887–1948)
 Lothar von Seebach (1853–1930)
 Adolf Seel (1829–1907)
 Else Sehrig-Vehling (1897–1994)
 Louise Seidler (1786–1866)
 Joseph Anton Settegast (1813–1890)
 Christian Seybold (1695–1768)
 Oskar Seyffert (1862–1940)
 Daryush Shokof (born 1954)
 Arthur Siebelist (1870–1945)
 Clara Siewert (1862–1945)
 Ludovike Simanowiz (1759–1827)
 Richard Simon (1898–1993)
 Franz Skarbina (1849–1910)
 Dirk Skreber (born 1961)
 Maria Slavona (1865–1931)
 Max Slevogt (1868–1932)
 Karl Ferdinand Sohn (1805–1867)
 Karl Rudolf Sohn (1845–1908)
 Richard Sohn (1834–1912)
 Wilhelm Sohn (1830–1899)
 Alfred Sohn-Rethel (1875–1958)
 Else Sohn-Rethel (1853–1933)
 Karli Sohn-Rethel (1882–1966)
 Otto Sohn-Rethel (1877–1949)
 Daniel Soreau (c. 1560–1619)
 Isaak Soreau (1604–1644)
 Michael Sowa (born 1945)
 August Specht (1849–1923)
 Friedrich Specht (1839–1909)
 Erwin Speckter (1806–1835)
 Johann Sperl (1840–1914)
 Walter Spies (1895–1942)
 Eugene Spiro (1874–1972)
 Carl Spitzweg (1808–1885)
 Hans Springinklee (c. 1490/5–c. 1540)
 Gertrud Staats (1859–1938)
 Anton Stankowski (1906–1998)
 Christian W. Staudinger (born 1952)
 Carl Steffeck (1818–1890)
 Jakob Steinhardt (1887–1968)
 Hermann Stenner (1891–1914)
 David D. Stern (born 1956)
 Robert Sterl (1867–1932)
 Joseph Karl Stieler (1781–1858)
 Franz Seraph Stirnbrand (c. 1788/94–1882)
 Dora Stock (1760–1832)
 Minna Stocks (1846–1928)
 Curt Stoermer (1891–1976)
 Fritz Stoltenberg (1855–1921)
 Eva Stort (1855–1936)
 Sebastian Stoskopff (1597–1657)
 Willy Stöwer (1864–1931) 
 Paul Strecker (1898–1950)
 Bernhard Strigel (c. 1461–1528)
 Helene Marie Stromeyer (1834–1924) 
 Hermann Struck (1876–1944)
 Franz von Stuck (1863–1928)
 Fritz Stuckenberg (1881–1944)
 Absolon Stumme (?–1499)
 Emil Stumpp (1886–1941)
 Helmut Sturm (1932–2008)
 Rudolph Suhrlandt (1781–1862)
 Florian Süssmayr (born 1963)
 Stefan Szczesny (born 1951)

T 

 Ruben Talberg (born 1964)
 Wilhelm Ternite (1786–1871)
 Ebba Tesdorpf (1851–1920)
 Heinz Tetzner (1920–2007)
 Anna Dorothea Therbusch (1721–1782)
 Ludwig Thiersch (1825–1909)
 Hans Thoma (1839–1924)
 Paul Thumann (1834–1908)
 Johann Heinrich Tischbein (1722–1789)
 Johann Jacob Tischbein (1725–1791)
 Johann Valentin Tischbein (1715–1768)
 Ernst Toepfer (1877–1955)
 Christiaan Tonnis (born 1956)
 Gero Trauth (born 1942)
 Hann Trier (1915–1999)
 Wilhelm Trübner (1851–1917)

U 

 Otto Ubbelohde (1867–1922)
 Günther Uecker (born 1930)
 Philipp Uffenbach (1566–1636)
 Fritz von Uhde (1848–1911)
 Maria Uhden (1892–1918)
 Fred Uhlman (1901–1985)
 Lesser Ury (1861–1931)
 Adolf Uzarski (1885–1970)

V 

 Johannes Veit (1790–1854)
 Philipp Veit (1793–1877)
 Henry Vianden (1814–1899)
 Clara Vogedes (1892–1983)
 Hugo Vogel (1855–1934)
 Heinrich Vogeler (1872–1942)
 Carl Christian Vogel von Vogelstein (1788–1868)
 Karl Völker (1889–1962)
 Max Volkhart (1848–1924)
 Adolph Friedrich Vollmer (1806–1875)
 Friedrich Voltz (1817–1886)
 Johann Michael Voltz (1784–1858)
 Friedrich Vordemberge-Gildewart (1899–1962)
 Wolf Vostell (1932–1998)

W 

 Karl Wilhelm Wach (1787–1845)
 Friedrich Wachenhusen (1859–1925)
 Carl Wagner (1796–1867)
 Johann Salomon Wahl (1689–1765)
 Paul Wallat (1879–1964)
 Horst Walter (1936–2012)
 Petrus Wandrey (1939–2012)
 Corinne Wasmuht (born 1964)
 Max Peiffer Watenphul (1896–1976)
 August Weber (1817–1873)
 Felix Weber (born 1965)
 Paul Weber (1823–1916)
 Johannes Wechtlin (c. 1480–?)
 Karl Weinmair (1906–1944)
 Friedrich Georg Weitsch (1758–1828)
 Theodor Leopold Weller (1802–1880)
 Gottlieb Welté (1745–1792)
 Anton von Werner (1843–1915)
 Eberhard Werner (1924–2002)
 Brigitta Westphal (born 1944)
 Friedrich Bernhard Westphal (1803–1844)
 Sascha Wiederhold (1904–1962)
 Christian Wilberg (1839–1882)
 Ludwig Wilding (1927–2010)
 August von Wille (1828–1887)
 Michael Willmann (1630–1706)
 Albert Windisch (1878–1967)
 Fritz Winter (1905–1976)
 Harald Winter (born 1953)
 Franz Xaver Winterhalter (1805–1873)
 Hermann Wislicenus (1825–1899)
 Adolf Wissel (1894–1973)
 Johann Michael Wittmer (1802–1880)
 Edmund Wodick (1816–1886)
 Christoph Wilhelm Wohlien (1811–1869)
 Karla Woisnitza (born 1952)
 Julie Wolfthorn (1864–1944)
 Joseph Wolf (1820–1899)
 Balduin Wolff (1819–1907)
 Michael Wolgemut (1434–1519)
 Gert Heinrich Wollheim (1894–1974)
 Walter Womacka (1925–2010)
 Georg Philipp Wörlen (1886–1954)
 Franz Wulfhagen (c. 1624–1670)
 Paul Wunderlich (1927–2010)
 Noah Wunsch (born 1970)
 Nicholas Wurmser (1298–1367)

Z 

 Erich Zander (1889–1965)
 Herbert Zangs (1924–2003)
 Johann Eleazar Zeissig (1737–1806)
 Bartholomäus Zeitblom (c. 1450–c. 1519)
 Wolfgang Zelmer (born 1948)
 Alexander Zick (1845–1907)
 Januarius Zick (1730–1797)
 Adolf Ziegler (1892–1959)
 Hans-Peter Zimmer (1936–1992)
 Adolf Zimmermann (1799–1859)
 Albert Zimmermann (1808–1888)
 Clemens von Zimmermann (1788–1869)
 Johann Baptist Zimmermann (1680–1758)
 Max Zimmermann (1811–1878)
 Reinhard Sebastian Zimmermann (1815–1893)
 Richard Zimmermann (1820–1875)
 Robert Zimmermann (1815–1864)
 Thomas Zipp (born 1966)
 Heinrich von Zügel (1850–1941)
 Anton Zwengauer (1810–1884)
 Anton Georg Zwengauer (1850–1928)
 Gustav Philipp Zwinger (1779–1819)
 Oskar Zwintscher (1870–1916)

See also 
:Category:German painters
List of German artists – including all visual and plastic arts
List of German women artists

References

External links 
 

Painters
German